Dost is a 1944 Bollywood film produced under the banner Navin Pictures, directed by Shaukat Hussain Rizvi. Kanhaiyalal and Maya Banerjee play the lead with Agha, Himalaya Dasani, Husn Banu, Mirza Musharraf, Motilal, Noor Jehan, Ram Pyari, Shaukat Hussain Rizvi, Sherali and Varmala Kumthekar in the supporting cast. The film song lyrics were written by Shams Lakhnavi, with music composed by Sajjad Hussain.

Film's reception
This film ended up being ranked as number 21 on the list of (Top Earners 1940 – 1949) by the Box Office India.

Cast
Kanhaiyalal
Maya Banerjee
Agha
Himalaya Dasani
Husn Banu
Mirza Musharraf
Motilal
Noorjahan
Ram Pyari
Shaukat Hussain Rizvi
Sherali
Varmala Kumthekar

Soundtrack
Dost was the first film of Sajjad Hussain as an independent music director, and its soundtrack featured hit songs.

References

External links

1944 films
1940s Hindi-language films
Indian black-and-white films